Scissortail rasbora is a name used for several Asian freshwater fish that sometimes are seen in the aquarium trade:

 Dwarf scissortail rasbora (Rasbosoma spilocerca)
 Gangetic scissortail rasbora (Rasbora rasbora)
 Greater scissortail (Rasbora caudimaculata)
 Three-lined rasbora or scissortail rasbora (Rasbora trilineata)